Neocoenyra masaica is a butterfly in the family Nymphalidae. It is found in southern Kenya and northern Tanzania. The habitat consists of open thorn-bush woodland at altitudes of about 1,600 meters.

References

Satyrini
Butterflies described in 1958